Junonia terea, the soldier pansy or soldier commodore, is a butterfly of the family Nymphalidae. The species was first described by Dru Drury in 1773. It is found in the Afrotropical realm.

The wingspan is 50–55 mm in males and 52–60 mm in females.

The larvae feed on Asystasia gangetica, Phaulopsis imbricata, and Ruellia patula.

Subspecies 
Junonia terea terea (Senegal, the Gambia, Guinea-Bissau, Guinea, Sierra Leone, Liberia, Ivory Coast, Burkina Faso, Ghana, Togo, Benin, Nigeria, Cameroon, Gabon, Congo, Democratic Republic of the Congo, western Kenya)
Junonia terea elgiva Hewitson, 1864 (coast of Kenya, Tanzania, Pemba Island, Angola, eastern and southern Democratic Republic of the Congo, Malawi, northern Zambia, Mozambique, eastern Zimbabwe, Eswatini, South Africa: Limpopo, Mpumalanga, KwaZulu-Natal, Eastern Cape)
Junonia terea fumata (Rothschild & Jordan, 1903) (Ethiopia, Somalia)
Junonia terea tereoides (Butler, 1901) (northern Democratic Republic of the Congo, southern Sudan, Uganda, central Kenya, north-western Tanzania)

References 

terea
Butterflies of Africa
Butterflies described in 1773
Taxa named by Dru Drury